Kanna Asakura; born October 12, 1997 in Chiba, Japan is a female Japanese mixed martial artist. She competes in the Atomweight (106 lb) division and is currently signed with the Rizin Fighting Federation. She is the #6 ranked Atomweight in the world according to Sherdog and #3 Atomweight according to Fight Matrix.

Background
Due to her father's influence, she started wrestling from the age of 5 and belonged to "Tokyo Gold Kids" from the upper grades of elementary school. Asakura won first at the 2011 Klippan Ladies International Wrestling Tournament in the cadet division for 38kg and in the first year of high school, she achieved a brilliant record of 3rd place in the 46 kg class of the National High School Championships.

She quit wrestling at 16, she re-entered high school, and while thinking about what to do with her future, saw footage of shoot boxing and shoot wrestling bouts. Seeing an avenue to make use of her wrestling and the Jiu Jitsu she was learning, she started mixed martial arts.

Mixed martial arts career

Asakura made her professional mixed martial arts debut on October 4, 2014 at the age of 17 when she faced Naomi Okaki at Vale Tudo Japan 6 and won by unanimous decision. Following this, Asakura compiled a professional record of 9–2, with wins over Yasuko Tamada and Saori Ishioka, before signing with the Rizin Fighting Federation to join their Super Bantamweight World Grand Prix Tournament in December 2017.

Rizin FF

Super Atomweight Grand Prix
Victorious in the quarterfinals and semifinals, Asakura advanced to the finals, then competing in front of 18,316 fans in what was arguably the biggest women’s title fight in Japanese MMA history, choked out Shoot Boxing superstar Rena Kubota to become the Super Atomweight Grand Prix winner.

On May 6, 2018 Kanna Asakura faced Melissa Sophia Karagianis at Rizin 10. She won the fight via three round unanimous decision extending her win streak to 7. After the fight Rena Kubota entered the ring and challenged her to a rematch. Soon after the fight was made official, and scheduled to take place on July 29, 2018 at Rizin 11 in Saitama, Japan. Despite several improvements from Rena, Asakura used her relentless pressure to win the bout by unanimous decision.

First title shot
Asakura faced Ayaka Hamasaki on December 21, 2018 at Rizin 14 for the inaugural Rizin Super Atomweight Championship. She lost the bout in the second rout via armbar.

On March 9, 2019, she faced against DEEP JEWELS Atomweight champion Tomo Maesawa in a non-title bout at Deep Jewels 23 and won via a unanimous decision.

On June 2, 2019, Asakura faced Miyuu Yamamoto at Rizin 16. She lost the bout via unanimous decision.

On August 18, 2019, Kanna faced future Invicta FC Atomweight Champion Alesha Zappitella at RIZIN 18 and won a split unanimous decision.

On December 29, 2019, Kanna faced Jamie Hinshaw at Bellator 237/Bellator Japan and won via a third round armbar.

On August 9, 2020, she faced Mizuki Furuse at Rizin 22 and won via TKO by pounding.

On December 31, 2020, Kanna faced Ai Shimizu at Rizin 26, winning the bout via unanimous decision.

Second title shot
Asakura faced Ayaka Hamasaki in a rematch for the Rizin Super Atomweight Championship at Rizin 27 on March 21, 2021. She lost a close bout via split decision.

Asakura faced the reigning Jewels atomweight and DEEP Microweight champion Saori Oshima at Rizin 31 - Yokohama on October 24, 2021. She lost the bout via split decision.

Asakura faced the Shooto Super Atomweight champion Satomi Takano on April 17, 2022 at Rizin 35. She won the fight by unanimous decision.

Super Atomweight Grand Prix 2022
Asakura faced Si Woo Park in the quarterfinal bout of the Rizin Super Atomweight Grand Prix at Rizin 37 - Saitama on July 31, 2022. She lost the fight by unanimous decision.

Personal life

After her bout at Rizin 11, Asakura was seen hugging kickboxing superstar Tenshin Nasukawa, fuelling further speculation that they may be in a relationship. They later confirmed that they were dating. They broke up at the end of 2019 after photos of Tenshin being physical with Rizin ring girl, Hakase Mai, leaked online.

She also has a Youtube channel with 100K subscribers and 15 million views.

Championships and accomplishments
Rizin Fighting Federation
 Rizin Women's Super Atomweight Grand Prix Winner

Mixed martial arts record

|-
|Loss
|align=center| 19–7
|Si Woo Park
|Decision (unanimous)
|Rizin 37
|
|align=center| 3
|align=center| 5:00
|Saitama, Japan
|
|-
|Win
|align=center|19–6
|Satomi Takano
|Decision (unanimous)
|Rizin 35
|
|align=center|3
|align=center|5:00
|Chōfu, Japan
| 
|-
|Loss
|align=center| 18–6
|Saori Oshima
|Decision (split)
|Rizin 31
|
|align=center|3
|align=center|5:00
|Yokohama, Japan
|
|-
|Loss
|align=center| 18–5
|Ayaka Hamasaki
|Decision (split)
|Rizin 27
|
|align=center|3
|align=center|5:00
|Nagoya, Japan
|
|-
| Win
|align=center| 18–4
| Ai Shimizu
| Decision (unanimous)
| Rizin 26
| 
|align=center| 3
|align=center| 5:00
|Saitama, Japan
| 
|-
| Win
|align=center| 17–4
| Mizuki Furuse
| TKO (punches)
| Rizin 22
| 
|align=center| 1
|align=center| 1:35
|Yokohama, Japan
| 
|-
| Win
|align=center| 16–4
| Jayme Hinshaw
| Submission (kimura)
| Bellator 237
| 
|align=center| 3
|align=center| 3:33
|Saitama, Japan
| 
|-
| Win
|align=center| 15–4
| Alesha Zappitella
| Decision (split)
| Rizin 18
| 
| align=center| 3
| align=center| 5:00
| Nagoya, Japan
| 
|-
|Loss
|align=center| 14–4
| Miyuu Yamamoto
|Decision (unanimous)
|Rizin 16
|
|align=center|3
|align=center|5:00
|Kobe, Japan
| 
|-
| Win
|align=center| 14–3
| Tomo Maesawa
| Decision (unanimous)
| Deep Jewels 23
| 
|align=center| 3
|align=center| 5:00
|Tokyo, Japan
| 
|-
| Loss
|align=center| 13–3
| Ayaka Hamasaki
|Submission (armbar)
|Rizin 14
|
|align=center|2
|align=center|4:34
|Saitama, Japan
|
|-
| Win
|align=center| 13–2
| Rena Kubota
|Decision (unanimous)
|Rizin 11
|
|align=center|3
|align=center|5:00
|Saitama, Japan
|
|-
| Win
|align=center| 12–2
| Melissa Sophia Karagianis
| Decision (unanimous)
|Rizin 10
| 
|align=center| 3
|align=center| 5:00
|Fukuoka, Japan
| 
|-
| Win
|align=center| 11–2
| Rena Kubota
| Technical Submission (rear-naked choke)
| Rizin World Grand-Prix 2017: Final Round
| 
|align=center| 1
|align=center| 4:34
|Saitama, Japan
|
|-
| Win
|align=center| 10–2
| Maria de Oliveira Neta
| Submission (armbar)
| Rizin World Grand-Prix 2017: Final Round
| 
|align=center| 2
|align=center| 3:40
|Saitama, Japan
|
|-
| Win
|align=center| 9–2
| Sylwia Juśkiewicz
| Decision (unanimous)
|Rizin World Grand Prix 2017: Opening Round - Part 2
| 
|align=center| 3
|align=center| 5:00
|Fukuoka, Japan
|
|-
| Win
|align=center| 8–2
| Saori Ishioka
| Decision (unanimous)
| Deep Jewels 17
| 
|align=center| 3
|align=center| 5:00
|Tokyo, Japan
|
|-
| Win
|align=center| 7–2
| Aleksandra Toncheva Plamenova
| Decision (unanimous)
| Rizin 2017 in Yokohama: Sakura 
| 
|align=center| 2
|align=center| 5:00
|Yokohama, Japan 
| 
|-
| Win
|align=center| 6–2
| Natsuki Shimomakise
| Submission (rear-naked choke)
| Deep Jewels 15
| 
|align=center| 1
|align=center| 2:29
|Tokyo, Japan
| 
|-
|Loss
|align=center| 5–2
| Alyssa Garcia
| Decision (unanimous)
| Rizin World Grand Prix 2016: 2nd Round
| 
|align=center| 3
|align=center| 5:00
|Saitama, Japan
| 
|-
| Win
|align=center| 5–1
| Yoon Ha Hong
| Decision (unanimous)
|Deep Jewels 13
| 
|align=center| 2
|align=center| 5:00
|Tokyo, Japan
| 
|-
| Win
|align=center| 4–1
| Mikiko Hiyama
| Submission (rear naked choke)
| Shooto: Professional Shooto 7/17
| 
|align=center| 1
|align=center| 3:43
|Tokyo, Japan
| 
|-
|Loss
|align=center| 3–1
| Syuri Kondo
| Decision (unanimous)
| Pancrase 277
| 
|align=center| 3
|align=center| 3:00
|Tokyo, Japan
| 
|-
| Win
|align=center| 3–0
| Yasuko Tamada
| Decision (unanimous)
| Vale Tudo Japan: VTJ 7th
| 
|align=center| 3
|align=center| 3:00
|Tokyo, Japan
| 
|-
| Win
|align=center| 2–0
| Miyuki Furusawa
| Submission (rear naked choke)
| Vale Tudo Japan: VTJ in Osaka
| 
|align=center| 1
|align=center| 2:17
|Tokyo, Japan
| 
|-
| Win
|align=center| 1–0
| Naomi Okaki
| Decision (unanimous)
| Vale Tudo Japan: VTJ 6th
| 
|align=center| 3
|align=center| 5:00
|Ōta, Tokyo, Japan
|
|-

Amateur mixed martial arts record

|-
| Win
|align=center| 1-0
| Mikiko Hiyama
| Submission (Rear naked choke)
| Shooto / STF - Hardball
| 
|align=center| 1
|align=center| 3:18
|Nagano, Japan
|
|-
|}

See also 
 List of current Rizin FF fighters
 List of female mixed martial artists

References

1997 births
Living people
People from Chiba Prefecture
Japanese female mixed martial artists
Atomweight mixed martial artists
Mixed martial artists utilizing wrestling
Mixed martial artists utilizing boxing
Mixed martial artists utilizing Brazilian jiu-jitsu
Japanese practitioners of Brazilian jiu-jitsu
Female Brazilian jiu-jitsu practitioners